Fadhil Abbas al-Ka'bi  (born 1955) is an Iraqi author of children's literature and childhood studies. From 1978, he turned to journalism and was appointed in various positions, including head of the Children's Literature Association in Iraq from its founding in 1993 until 2000. He emerged in the 1990s as a literary critic, writer and researcher specializing in Arabic children's literature, theater and culture. He received many awards, certificates of appreciation and honorary doctorates from several institutions for his literary and journalistic career.

Biography and career 
Fadhil Abbas Ali al-Ka'bi was born in Mahmoudiyah in 1955. He has been working in journalism since 1978 and in many cultural, media and literary institutions and organizations concerned with children's issues in Iraq.

Official 
Al-Ka'bi is a founding member and then head of the Children's Literature Association in Iraq from its founding in 1993 until 2000, a founding member of the Support Iraqi Children Organization since its founding in 1992, he held several positions there until 2002. He was the official of the Children's Literature Club in the Union of Iraqi Writers from 1998 to 2001. From 1990s he held several positions  in several civil institutions and organizations, as a member of the jury, an expert and an advisor for children's culture.

Media 
He was appointed deputy editor-in-chief of the magazine Al-Tofoula from 1996 until 2003, and editor-in-chief of Children of the Future magazine until 2011. He wrote and prepared many children's programs and series on Iraqi Radio and Television from the 1970s until the 1990s. He also wrote many educational songs and chants for children. Al-Ka'bi is a consultant and expert on scientific culture and children's culture at the Iraq Foundation for Media Scientific and Culture (IGFMSC).

Awards 
  Awarded  honorary doctorate by Cambridge Academy for Science and Technology 
 1994: Children's Poetry Award from the Iraqi Child Welfare Commission
 1999: Child Song Festival Award, Jordan 
 2009: First prize in children's poetry from the Iraqi Children's Culture Department, Iraqi Ministry of Culture
 2010: First prize in children's poetry from the Iraqi Ministry of Culture
 2010 and 2011: Best writer of children's play by a poll of the Eyon Foundation for Cultrue and Arts
 2010: Abdul Hameed Shoman prize for Children's Literature in the Field of Critical Studies.

Works

Children's literature

Children's studies

References 

1955 births
Children's poets
20th-century Iraqi poets
21st-century Iraqi poets
Iraqi male short story writers
Iraqi children's writers
People from Baghdad Province
20th-century Iraqi journalists
21st-century Iraqi journalists
Iraqi essayists
Scholars of childhood
Iraqi literary scholars
Children's songwriters
Writers of young adult literature
Living people